FV Shahzaib is a Pakistani fishing vessel, captured by Somali pirates and used as a mother ship in the attack on the .

References

Piracy in Somalia
Maritime incidents in 2009
Pakistan–Somalia relations
Merchant ships of Pakistan
Fishing vessels
Fishing in Pakistan